"Being for the Benefit of Mr. Kite!" is a song recorded by the English rock band the Beatles for their 1967 album Sgt. Pepper's Lonely Hearts Club Band. It was written and composed primarily by John Lennon and credited to Lennon–McCartney.

Most of the lyrics came from a 19th-century circus poster for Pablo Fanque's Circus Royal appearance at Rochdale. It was one of three songs from the Sgt. Pepper album that was banned from playing on the BBC, supposedly because the phrase "Henry the Horse" combined two words that were individually known as slang for heroin. Lennon denied that the song had anything to do with heroin.

Background

The inspiration to write the song was a 19th-century circus poster for Pablo Fanque's Circus Royal appearance at Rochdale. Lennon purchased the poster on 31 January 1967 at a Sevenoaks antiques shop while the Beatles were filming promotional films for "Strawberry Fields Forever" in Sevenoaks, Kent. Lennon claimed years later to still have the poster in his home. "Everything from the song is from that poster," he explained, "except the horse wasn't called Henry." (The poster identifies the horse as "Zanthus".)

The song's lyrics (based on the original poster) detail the evening's program, which was to occur at Bishopsgate in the following sequence: On Saturday at 5:50 pm the band was to begin playing while Mr. Kite would perform, flying "through the ring." Meanwhile, Mr. Henderson would execute ten somersaults, and then perform on the trampoline, "over men and horses, hoops and garters," and "lastly through a hogshead of real fire." This act would be followed by the Hendersons dancing and singing. Finally, Henry the Horse would dance the waltz.

Mr. Kite is believed to be William Kite, who worked for Pablo Fanque from 1843 to 1845. "Mr. J. Henderson" was John Henderson, a wire-walker, equestrian, trampoline artist, and clown. While the poster made no mention of "Hendersons" plural, as Lennon sings, John Henderson did perform with his wife Agnes, the daughter of circus owner Henry Hengler. The Hendersons performed throughout Europe and Russia during the 1840s and 1850s.  

"Being for the Benefit of Mr. Kite!" is credited to Lennon–McCartney, but Lennon said he had written it entirely himself. In 1977, when shown a list of songs Lennon claimed writing on (including "Mr. Kite"), McCartney disputed only "In My Life". In his 1997 memoir, he claimed to have also co-written "Mr. Kite". In a 2013 interview with Rolling Stone magazine, he recalled spending an afternoon with Lennon writing the song based on the poster, and said that "the song just wrote itself".

Recording
One of the most musically complex songs on Sgt. Pepper, it was recorded by the Beatles on 17 February 1967 with overdubs on 20 February (organ sound effects), 28 March (harmonica, organ, guitar), 29 March (more organ effects) and 31 March. Lennon wanted the track to have a "carnival atmosphere", and told producer George Martin that he wanted "to smell the sawdust on the floor". In the middle eight bars, multiple recordings of fairground organs and calliope music were spliced together to attempt to satisfy this request.  In a 1968 interview, Martin recalled that he achieved this "by playing the Hammond organ myself and speeding it up". In addition to the Hammond organ, an attempt was made to find a 19th-century steam organ for hire in London, to enhance the carnival atmosphere effect, but to no avail. After a great deal of unsuccessful experimentation, Martin instructed recording engineer Geoff Emerick to chop the tape into pieces with scissors, throw them up in the air, and re-assemble them at random.

Before the start of the first take, Lennon sings the words "For the benefit of Mr. Kite!" in a joke accent, then Emerick announces, "For the Benefit of Mr. Kite! This is take 1."  Lennon immediately responds, "Being for the Benefit of Mr. Kite!", reinforcing his title preference from a phrase lifted intact from the original Pablo Fanque poster. The exchange is recorded in The Beatles Recording Sessions and audible on track 8 of disc 2 of Anthology 2. The original recording can also be heard during the loading screen for the song if it is downloaded in the 2009 video game The Beatles: Rock Band.

Although Lennon once said of the song that he "wasn't proud of that" and "I was just going through the motions", in 1980 he described it as "pure, like a painting, a pure watercolour". AllMusic stated that "the Beatles and Martin pulled out all the stops to make a layer of sound that was only possible to create in the recording studio [...] resulting in a sound both redolent of the circuses of bygone days, and as avant-garde as anything in rock music."

Personnel
 John Lennon – double-tracked lead vocals, Hammond organ, tape loops, and harmonica
 Paul McCartney – bass guitar, lead guitar
 George Harrison – harmonica, tambourine, harmony vocal, shaker
 Ringo Starr – drums, tambourine
 George Martin – piano, harmonium, Lowrey organ, Wurlitzer organ, Mellotron, Hammond organ, glockenspiel, tape loops
 Mal Evans – bass harmonica
 Neil Aspinall – harmonica
 Geoff Emerick – tape loops

Notes

Citations

Sources

External links
 
 Discussion of the original poster
 A short film with close-up shots of the original poster as well as its history, including replications
 Comparisons of modern reproductions of the poster with the original

Songs about theatre
1967 songs
Bee Gees songs
Song recordings produced by George Martin
Songs published by Northern Songs
Songs written by Lennon–McCartney
The Beatles songs
Circus music
Songs banned by the BBC
Psychedelic songs